Singapore Kwong Wai Siew Peck San Theng is a cultural organisation and columbarium based in Bishan, Singapore with beginnings since 1870. Located at Bishan Lane off Bishan Road, Peck San Theng presently operates a columbarium, two Chinese temples, and ancestral worship services tailoring towards the requirements as well as traditions, customs and beliefs of a cosmopolitan community. It is currently managed by 16 Cantonese and Hakka clan associations.

History
Kwong Wai Siew Peck San Theng was originally a cemetery in Singapore that was established in 1870 by Cantonese and Hakka immigrants largely from the three prefectures of Guangzhou, Huizhou and Zhaoqing in Guangdong Province, China. The first words of the three prefectures, Guang-Hui-Zhao were the origins of the name , or transliterated as Kwong-Wai-Siew.

In 1979, the Singapore government decided to acquire all its land to create the present-day Bishan Town. Many graves were exhumed and remains cremated during the 1980s. To enable Peck San Theng to continue with its tradition, the government leased  of land to Peck San Theng for accommodating an office block, two temples and a columbarium. The columbarium houses some 100,000 niches which are available to the public irrespective of race, language and religion since 1980. It was and will continue to be a place for ancestral worship in Singapore. Peck San Teng also provides financial support to the Kwong Wai Shiu Hospital, a charitable organisation that provides healthcare and hospice services to the aged and needy. 

In 2018, a heritage gallery was built in Kwong Wai Siew Peck San Theng to illustrate the story of Kampong San Teng.

Present Day
Peck San Theng is currently managed by a federation of 16 clans of the Cantonese and Hakka communities in Singapore. 
Nam Sun
Ning Yeung
Chung Shan
Poon Yue
Fa Yun
Kong Chow
Sam Sui
Tung On
Shun Tak
Ching Yuen
Chen Loong
Wui Chiu
Siu Heng
Koh Yiu
Hok San
Yen Peng

Grand Universal Salvation Ritual
Grand Universal Salvation Ritual (万缘胜会) was first introduced to Peck San Theng in 1921. Since then, it has become one of the most significant religious event that will be  organise once every five years. The grand ritual is usually collectively conducted by a group of Buddhist monks and nuns and a troupe of Taoist priests. The spiritual significance of this ritual is about preserving and promoting important family value like filial piety.

References

External links
 http://www.sgpecksantheng.com

Columbaria in Singapore
Buildings and structures in Bishan, Singapore
Hakka culture in Singapore